Martin Kastler (born 18 June 1974 in Nuremberg) is a German politician of the CSU who served as a Member of the European Parliament from 2003 until 2004 and from 2009 until 2014.

Early life and career 
After attending the Martin-Behaim-Gymnasium in Nuremberg Kastler studied History and Political Sciences in Erlangen and Prague. From 1996 to 1997 he gathered experience in the field of European policy as an employee in the Foreign Policy Department of the President of the Czech Republic, Václav Havel. Thereafter, Kastler became press spokesman for the Nuremberg Metropole region and editor for DATEV. Since 1996 Kastler works freelance as a journalist and publicist. From 2004 until his re-entrance into the European Parliament in December 2008 he was head of the Development Policy Department and Coordinator for EU-Projects for the Hanns Seidel Foundation.

Martin Kastler is married, has three children and lives in Schwabach.

Political career 
Kastler is member of the CSU since 1993. He is Local Board Member of the CSU for Nuremberg-Fürth-Schwabach and Deputy Chairman of the Schwabach District CSU Association.

Member of Parliament
Martin Kastler's first term in European Parliament for the CSU spanned from 2003 to 2004, as successor of Emilia Müller, who was called to government by the former Minister-president of Bavaria, Edmund Stoiber. After the Bavarian regional elections in September 2008 Kastler succeeded Alexander Radwan. At the European elections 2009 Martin Kastler was elected for Member of the European Parliament for the whole legislative period 2009-2014.

Memberships 
Kastler is member of the parliamentarian group of "Europa Union".

Committees and Delegations 
Martin Kastler is member of the Committee on Employment and Social Affairs and substitute member of the Committee on Development. Moreover, he is member of the Delegation EU-Former Yugoslav Republic of Macedonia and substitute member of the Delegation to the Joint Parliamentary Assembly EU-ACP. Kastler is spokesman for Social and Development Policy of the CSU group in the European Parliament. Furthermore, he holds the office of Vice Chairman of the Intergroup 'Bioethics' as well as of the EPP Working Group 'Bioethics' in the European Parliament.

Honorary Activities 
Martin Kastler is Chairman of the Sudeten German-Czech 'Ackermann Gemeinde', Former Scholar of Hanns Seidel Foundation, member of the Malteser emergency service, member of 'Christdemokraten für das Leben', District Chairman and board member of the 'Pan-Europa Union'. Furthermore, he is member of the Central Committee of German Catholics (ZdK).
In 1999 Kastler acquired the Czech Language Certificate. Occasionally, Kastler plays the organ in the area of Nuremberg, having played regularly in a Nuremberg parish for a longer period of time.

The First European Citizens' Initiative for a Europe-wide protection of the Sunday 
Martin Kastler is initiator of the First European Citizens' Initiative whose aim it is to protect the Sunday Europe-wide as a day of rest. To that end, he presented the Online-Campagneportal "Mum and Dad belong to us on Sunday!" on 10 February 2010 at the European Parliament in Strasbourg.

Kastler shares the conviction that the Sunday needs to be protected as work-free day of family and rest in order that children do not run the risk of suffering most from today's flexibilisation of our business world anymore. The key to a successful protection of children is giving parents time for their children. Thus, the introduction of a work-free Sunday contributes to turning Europe into the world's most child-oriented area. Besides, Kastler hints at the historical entrenchment of the work-free Sunday in the European social welfare net as well as at the proven advantages of a free weekday on health.

Up to now, Kastler can rejoice at the support of the 'Verband der Katholiken in Wirtschaft und Verwaltung' (KKV), the 'Bonifatiuswerk' as well as the 'Ackermann Gemeinde'.

External links 
 Web presentation of Martin Kastler
 Biography at the European Parliament
 Online-Campagneportal of the First European Citizens' Initiative for a work-free Sunday

MEPs for Germany 1999–2004
Christian Social Union in Bavaria MEPs
1974 births
Living people
Politicians from Nuremberg
MEPs for Germany 2004–2009
MEPs for Germany 2009–2014